William A. Shine Great Neck South High School (commonly Great Neck South, South High School, or GNSHS) is a four-year public high school located in the Lake Success village of Great Neck, New York. The school serves students in grades 9 through 12 and is in the Great Neck school district.

Great Neck South is one of three high schools in the Great Neck school district, the others being Great Neck North High School and Great Neck Village High School. Great Neck South offers its 1,222 students academic acceleration, along with special education classes for students with disabilities. The school opened in 1958 and was named Great Neck South High School until 2006.

As of the 2021-22 school year, the school had an enrollment of 1,222 students and 114.75 classroom teachers (on an FTE basis), for a student–teacher ratio of 10.65:1. There were 217 students (17.8% of enrollment) eligible for free lunch and 27 (2.2% of students) eligible for reduced-cost lunch.

Campus history and school facilities

In 1949, the School District acquired the  South complex in Lake Success from the former estate of Henry Phipps, Jr., steelmaster and one-time partner of Andrew Carnegie. The rest of the property was purchased for $279,000. In 1957, South High School was built on property surrounding the administration building. When the estate was donated, there was a stipulation that part of it be kept in its natural state, a condition that was met during construction.

One of the final remaining intact portions of the Long Island Motor Parkway, the first road in the United States built solely for automobiles, runs through the campus of the High School.

In 1958, Great Neck Senior High School was renamed Great Neck North High School to differentiate it from the district's new Great Neck South High School. Prior to 1979, Great Neck South High School included grades 10 through 12. In 1980, grade 9 was added. In 2006, the school was renamed to honor Dr. William A. Shine for his respected status in the Great Neck School District.

Great Neck South has more restrictions on its open campus than Great Neck North. Rona Telsey, a spokesperson for the district, said that while Great Neck North is near a major shopping center, Great Neck South is further away. In addition, she said that a student would need to use a car to go off-campus for lunch. Prior to 1980, all students had open campus. In 1980, the school decided that younger students at Great Neck needed more restrictions than older students. Beginning in 1980, only 11th and 12th graders at Great Neck South had open campus privileges.

Mascot and flag history 
Prior to the early 1980s, South High School used a Confederate battle flag as part of its logo, along with a gray Confederate rebel representing it as a mascot. Great Neck South quarterback David Gurfein, from the Class of 1983, recalled, “We would go down to Middle Neck Road waving these confederate flags. We had so much team spirit, so much unity, so much energy.” 

While the flag has ties to the Confederate South, the school and town alike did not identify it with the flag's history, but rather saw it solely as a representation of school spirit, and a pun of it being Great Neck's "southern" high school rather than any purposeful ill intent. After the 1981 lynching of Michael Donald in Mobile, Alabama and being made aware of the flag's history seeing contemporary pictures of the Ku Klux Klan with it in the background, Gurfein regretted the mascot and flag use, and lead a successful effort to replace the Confederate flag and soldier with a more generic American Revolutionary War rebel and Betsy Ross flag.

Academics
Newsweek ranked Great Neck South High School 49th out of 500 in its 2011 list Best High Schools in America. (The school has been cited in Newsweek's public school rankings on several other occasions). Students are offered Advanced Placement, honors, and accelerated courses as well. Great Neck South’s disabled students attend special education classes. One of the Advanced Placement physics courses tested the audience response technology which was successful and the Great Neck School District has expanded the technology to other schools.

The majority of South High students (more than 90%) achieve a B average or better. 98% of the South High School Class of 2019 entered college. 19% were recognized as finalists or received Letters of Commendation from the National Merit Scholarship Corporation.

Events

Cultural Heritage
One of the most popular events at Great Neck South is Cultural Heritage Night, where students put on a two-hour extravaganza of multicultural art, theater and dance.

Blazing Trails-4-Autism 
Great Neck South has hosted the Blazing Trails-4-Autism on its campus. In 2009 the Run/Walk was selected to be a part of the USATF-Long Island Grand Prix of Long Island Road Races.

Rebel War 
Rebel War is a tradition in which the four teams, divided by graduation year, compete for fun. Events include speedball and tug of war. The members of each team dress in their corresponding team colors and work to design a class banner for their teams. In years prior to 2023, the school's annual Rebel War has been cancelled due to COVID.

Enrollment

Demographics
As of the 2021-2022 school year, the student body consists of: 

 0     American Indian or Alaska Native students or 0% of the student body
 11   Black or African American students or 9% of the student body
 102   Hispanic or Latino students or 8% of the student body
 843 Asian or Native Hawaiian/Other Pacific Islander students or 79% of the student body
 243 White students or 20% of the student body
 23 Multiracial students or 2% of the student body

The student population at Great Neck South is predominantly Asian American, with a large White minority and smaller Hispanic and Latino Americans and African American minorities. Approximately 128 students (11%) will be classified as Special Ed (2015-2016 school year). Approximately 103 (8.7%) students will be receiving TESL services (2015-2016 school year).

Great Neck South's total population, as of 2015-2016, is 1,198 (53.5% male, 46.5% female).

Grade 9:   288 (2015: 271)
Grade 10: 300 (2015: 302)
Grade 11: 307 (2015: 299)
Grade 12: 327 (2015: 328)

From the 2016 senior class, 318 students graduated, while 4 students did not. However, 4 students graduated during the summer of 2016.

Notable alumni
Dan Ahdoot:  comedian, star of Super Fun Night
Earl Beecham: National Football League player
Danielle Bernstein (born 1992, class of 2010): fashion designer and social media influencer 
Nikki Blonsky: actress who starred as Tracy Turnblad in the 2007 film version of Hairspray participated in South's theater program.
Peter de Sève: illustrator and animator 
Quinn Early (born 1965, class of 1983): National Football League player
Stuart Ewen: author
Jamie Gorelick: former Deputy Attorney General of the United States.
Mark J. Green (class of 1963): politician
David Gurfein: U.S. Marine Corps lieutenant colonel, and CEO of nonprofit organization United American Patriots
Mark Kelman: Stanford Law School professor
David Miner: Emmy Award-winning executive producer of NBC's 30 Rock 
Roy Niederhoffer (class of 1983): Founder and President of R. G. Niederhoffer Capital Investments, Inc., and Chairman of the New York City Opera
Bruce Paltrow: writer, television and movie producer, husband of Blythe Danner, and father of Gwyneth Paltrow
David Seidler: playwright 
Sarah Sherman: comedian, current cast member on Saturday Night Live  
Talia Shire: actress, starred in Rocky 
Bob Simon: TV correspondent 
Helen Slater: actress, singer, songwriter (transferred to the High School of Performing Arts)
Dawn Steel: movie studio executive
Jon Taffer (class of 1972): member of the bar & nightclub hall of fame, star of SpikeTV's Bar Rescue, and inventor of NFL Sunday Ticket.
Charles Williams (class of 1965): Former major league baseball pitcher for the New York Mets (1971) and the San Francisco Giants (1972–78).  Traded from the Mets to the Giants for Willie Mays.
Alexander Wissner-Gross (class of 2003), research scientist and entrepreneur

See also

 Education in the United States

References

Great Neck Peninsula
Public high schools in New York (state)
Educational institutions established in 1958
Schools in Nassau County, New York
1958 establishments in New York (state)